Jeon Mi-ra (born 6 February 1978) is a South Korean former professional tennis player.

She was the runner-up in the 1994 Wimbledon Championships girls' singles tournament, losing to Martina Hingis, 5–7, 4–6. As a professional, she won one WTA Tour doubles title, and reached a career-high doubles ranking of No. 120, in October 2004. Her husband is Yoon Jong-shin.

WTA career finals

Doubles: 1 (1 title)

ITF finals

Singles (7–12)

Doubles (12–14)

External links
 
 
 

1978 births
Living people
Sportspeople from North Jeolla Province
South Korean female tennis players
Asian Games medalists in tennis
Tennis players at the 1994 Asian Games
Tennis players at the 1998 Asian Games
Tennis players at the 2002 Asian Games
Universiade medalists in tennis
Asian Games bronze medalists for South Korea
Medalists at the 2002 Asian Games
Universiade gold medalists for South Korea
Universiade bronze medalists for South Korea
Medalists at the 1997 Summer Universiade
20th-century South Korean women
21st-century South Korean women